Perityle inyoensis, known by the common names Inyo rockdaisy and Inyo laphamia, is a rare species of flowering plant in the aster family.

It is endemic to Inyo County in eastern California.

Its habitat is dry, rocky mountain slopes, often in limestone.

Description
Perityle inyoensis is a subshrub made up of a cluster of several hairy slender stems up to about 25 centimeters long. The hairy, glandular leaves are one or two centimeters long, oval to triangular, pointed, and toothed on the edges. They may be arranged oppositely or alternately on the stems.

The inflorescence bears one to three flower heads each under a centimeter wide. The head has yellow disc florets and no ray florets. The fruit is a fuzzy achene about 3 millimeters long.

Conservation
It is a California Native Plant Society listed Endangered species, and is threatened by proposed mining.

References

External links
Calflora Database: Perityle inyoensis (Inyo rock daisy)
 Jepson eFlora (TJM2) treatment of Perityle inyoensis
USDA Plants Profile for Perityle inyoensis (Inyo rock daisy)
 UC CalPhotos gallery of Perityle inyoensis

Perityleae
Endemic flora of California
Flora of the California desert regions
Inyo Mountains
Natural history of Inyo County, California
Plants described in 1958